Series 5 may refer to:

 Aston Martin V8 Series 5, an automobile model
 BMW 5 Series, a line of automobiles
 GeForce 5 Series, a line of video cards
 Psion Series 5, a line of handheld computers
 South African Class 6E1, Series 5, a series of electric locomotives

See also
 500 series (disambiguation)
 System 5